Terry Mac Wilson Jr. (born August 28, 1964) is an American politician who is a Republican member of the Texas House of Representatives for the 20th District, which includes Burnet, Milam, and Williamson counties. He defeated incumbent Marsha Farney in the 2016 Republican primary election and went on to win the November 2016 general election unopposed.

In the general election held on November 6, 2018, Wilson again prevailed with 57,741 votes (71.6 percent) to 22,943 (28.4 percent) for Democrat Stephen M. Wyman.

A native of Odessa, Texas, Wilson holds a Bachelor of Science degree in business administration from Texas A&M University in College Station and a Master of Science in Strategic Logistics Plans and Management from the Air War University in Montgomery, Alabama. He served for thirty years in the United States Army and retired as a decorated colonel. He is a conservative legislator who supports school choice. He resides with his wife, Shannon, and two sons, William and Benjamin, in Marble Falls in Burnet County.

References

External links
 Campaign website
 Terry Wilson at the Texas Tribune

1964 births
Living people
Republican Party members of the Texas House of Representatives
21st-century American politicians
Texas A&M University alumni
United States Army officers
People from Odessa, Texas
People from Marble Falls, Texas
Baptists from Texas
Military personnel from Texas